July, July (2002) is a novel by Tim O'Brien, a National Book Award-winning author.

Brief Synopsis
The novel is about the 30th reunion of a graduating college class of 1969 that happened a year too late.  It's filled with characters bent up by society's pliers, and it constantly flashes back to moments that shaped their lives.  It expands on themes from his earlier novels: memory, hope, love, and war.

Plot summary
July, July is set in 2000, and members of the Darton Hall College class of 1969 are gathered, one year behind schedule, for their 30th reunion. Focusing on a dozen characters and life's pivotal moments rather than on a linear plot, O'Brien follows the ensemble cast (which includes a Vietnam vet, a draft dodger, a minister, a bigamous housewife and a manufacturer of mops) for whom "the world had whittled itself down to now or never," as they drink, flirt and reminisce. Interspersed are tales of other moments when each character experienced something that changed him or her forever. Jumping across decades, O'Brien reveals past loves and old betrayals that still haunt: Dorothy failed to follow Billy to Canada; Spook hammered out a "double marriage"; Ellie saw her lover drown; Paulette, in a moment of desperation, disgraced herself and ruined her career.

References 

Novels by Tim O'Brien (author)
Books by Tim O'Brien (author)
2002 American novels
Fiction set in 2000
Novels set in the United States
Houghton Mifflin books